Country House or The Country House may refer to:

 English country house, a large house or mansion in the English countryside
Country house (Spain), a type of a tourist accommodation
 Country House (horse), an American racehorse
 "Country House" (song), a 1995 song by Blur
 The Country House (play), 2014 play by Donald Margulies
 The Country House (restaurant), a restaurant in Clarendon Hills, Illinois
 Country house poem, a type of poem popular in 17th-century England

See also
Country Home (disambiguation)